The Back to Bass Tour was a concert tour by English musician and singer-songwriter Sting. The tour's start coincided with the release of 25 Years and The Best of 25 Years, two compilation albums that commemorated the 25th anniversary of Sting's solo career.

Background
The tour was officially announced on 12 September 2011 via his official page. The first announcements concerned shows to be held in Northern America between October and December 2011. On 15 November 2011, the European dates were announced. That leg of the tour ended in March 2012, followed by four performances in Africa.

Sting returned for the a summer tour to Northern America, playing seven shows in the beginning of June before heading back to Europe. He played several shows at festivals throughout June and July 2012.

In June 2012, Sting announced a return to Europe in fall, playing shows predominantly in France and Central Europe during November 2012.

On 22 January 2013 it was announced that Sting would continue to tour as part of the Back to Bass Tour in the Summer of 2013, with various shows being announced for Europe and Northern America. The tour would commence at the end of May 2013 with a concert in Kelowna, Canada, after a 10-month break. Further announcements of dates were made all through February and March, some of them explicitly stating that "... additional cities [are] to be announced!". The final dates were announced on his official page on 18 April 2013, with a concert being held at the famous Montreux Jazz Festival. The 2013 Summer tour will have 40 stops in Northern America and Europe, and will be most likely the last leg of this tour.

Tour dates

Festivals and other miscellaneous performances

This concert was a part of "Helsinki Classic Festival"
This concert was a part of "Norwegian Wood Festival"
This concert was a part of "Bergen Calling Festival"
This concert was a part of "TW Classic Festival"
This concert was a part of "EDP CoolJazz Festival"
This concert was a part of "Ibiza 123 Festival"
This concert was a part of "Henley Festival"
This concert was a part of "Cognac Blues Festival"
This concert was a part of "Pause Guitare Festival"
This concert was a part of "Les Déferlantes Festival"
This concert was a part of "Umbria Jazz Festival"
This concert was a part of "Voix du Gaou Festival"
This concert was a part of "Paléo Festival"

This concert was a part of "Vieilles Charrues Festival"
This concert was a part of "Big Dance Concert Series"
This concert was a part of "Ravinia Festival"
This concert was a part of "Life Festival"
This concert was a part of "Live at the Marquee Festival"
This concert was a part of "Main Square Festival"
This concert was a part of "Stavern Festival"
This concert was a part of "North Sea Jazz Festival"
This concert was a part of "Montreux Jazz Festival"
This concert was a part of "Jazz à Juan"
This concert was a part of "Live at Sunset Festival"
This concert was a part of "Suikerrock Festival"

Musicians
 Sting – vocals, bass, guitars
 Dominic Miller – guitars, bass, backing vocals
 Vinnie Colaiuta – drums, percussion
 David Sancious – piano, keyboards (March 2012 – 2013)
 Peter Tickell – fiddle, oud
 Jo Lawry – vocals, violin
 Rufus Miller – guitars, backing vocals (2011 – March 2012)
Source:

References

External links
 Official site with setlists and reviews of each concert
 Fansite

2011 concert tours
2012 concert tours
2013 concert tours
Sting (musician) concert tours